École secondaire des Chutes (Falls Secondary) may refer to:

École secondaire des Chutes (Rawdon) of the Commission scolaire des Samares
École secondaire des Chutes (Shawinigan) of the Commission scolaire de l'Énergie

See also
 Deschutes (disambiguation)
 Chute (disambiguation)